This is a list of Real Rescues episodes.

Series

Series One

Series Two

Series Three

Series Four

Series Five

Series Six

Series Seven

Real Rescues